Stemmer fra Balkan ("Figures in the Balkans") is a documentary book written by Jo Nesbø and Espen Søbye.

In it they recount their experiences travelling to Serbia to write about the war that started on March 23, 1999. The book discusses what kind of a war this was, and describes Norway's part in it.

Related links
 Bokkilden (book sellers) entry in Norwegian (Not operational.)
 Dagbladet's review of the book in Norwegian

Works about the Kosovo War
Norwegian non-fiction literature
Non-fiction books about war
Jo Nesbø
Cultural depictions of Slobodan Milošević
1999 non-fiction books
Yugoslav Wars books